Rasmus Mägi (born 4 May 1992) is an Estonian hurdler. At the 2012 Summer Olympics, he competed in the Men's 400 metres hurdles without qualifying for the semifinals. He won the silver medal at the 2014 European Championships. Mägi came in sixth at the 2016 Olympic Games with a national record of 48.40s.

Rasmus Mägi's parents are track and field athletes Taivo Mägi and Anne Mägi. His older sister is sprinter Maris Mägi.

International competitions

Personal best

Outdoor

Indoor

References

External links

1992 births
Living people
Estonian male hurdlers
Olympic athletes of Estonia
Athletes (track and field) at the 2012 Summer Olympics
Athletes (track and field) at the 2016 Summer Olympics
Sportspeople from Tartu
World Athletics Championships athletes for Estonia
European Athletics Championships medalists
Athletes (track and field) at the 2020 Summer Olympics
Miina Härma Gymnasium alumni